Han Choi (born May 20, 1989) is a Malawian swimmer, who specialized in sprint freestyle events. Choi became one of the first Malawian swimmers to compete at the 2004 Summer Olympics in Athens. She qualified for the women's 50 m freestyle, by receiving a Universality place from FINA in an entry time of 32.33. She challenged six other swimmers in heat two, including 14-year-olds Sameera Al-Bitar of Bahrain and Christal Clashing of Antigua and Barbuda. She posted a lifetime best of 31.62 to earn a fourth spot by 0.62 of a second behind joint winners Al-Bitar and Ghazal El Jobeili of Lebanon. Choi failed to advance into the semifinals, as she placed sixty-ninth overall on the last day of preliminaries.

References

1989 births
Living people
Malawian female swimmers
Olympic swimmers of Malawi
Swimmers at the 2004 Summer Olympics
Malawian female freestyle swimmers